Pierce Brothers Westwood Village Memorial Park & Mortuary is a cemetery and mortuary located in the Westwood Village area of Los Angeles. It is located at 1218 Glendon Avenue in Westwood, with an entrance from Glendon Avenue.

The cemetery was established as Sunset Cemetery in 1905, but had been used for burials since the 1880s. In 1926, the name was officially changed to Westwood Memorial Park and was later changed again to Pierce Brothers Westwood Village Memorial Park & Mortuary.

Although it is the resting place of some of the entertainment industry's greatest names, it also contains the graves of many uncelebrated people. For example, when Marilyn Monroe died in 1962, Joe DiMaggio, responsible for Monroe's arrangements, chose Westwood not because of its celebrities but because it was the resting place of her mother's friend, Grace Goddard, and Goddard's aunt, Ana Lower, both of whom had cared for Monroe as a child.

Notable interments

A
 Kip Addotta (1944–2019), comedian
 Milton Ager (1893–1979), musician, composer
 Charles Aidman (1925–1993), actor
 Eddie Albert (1906–2005), actor
 Margo Albert (1917–1985), actress, wife of Eddie Albert
 Shana Alexander (1925–2005), journalist, columnist, television commentator
 Claud Allister (1888–1970), actor
 Gitta Alpár (1903–1991), actress, opera singer
 Richard Anderson (1926–2017), actor, co-star of The Six Million Dollar Man and The Bionic Woman
 Patty Andrews (1918–2013), singer
 Tige Andrews (1920–2007), actor
 Ken Annakin (1914–2009), director
 Eve Arden (1908–1990), actress, comedian
 Jack Arnold (1916–1992), director
 Robert Armstrong (1890–1973), actor
 James Aubrey (1918–1994), producer
 Hy Averback (1920–1997), director
 Lew Ayres (1908–1996), actor

B

 Henny Backus (1911–2004), author, wife of Jim Backus
 Jim Backus (1913–1989), actor
 Richard Baer (1928–2008), screenwriter
 Dave Barbour (1912–1965), musician
 Edgar Barrier (1907–1964), actor
 Patricia Barry (1921–2016), actor
 Eileen Barton (1924–2006), singer
 Richard Basehart (1914–1984), actor
 Greg Bautzer (1911–1987), attorney
 Lee Phillip Bell (1928–2020), television host, producer
 William J. Bell (1927–2005), producer
 Isabel Bigley (1926–2006), actress
 Whit Bissell (1909–1996), actor
 Hilary Blake (1950–2007), musician
 Billy Bletcher (1894–1979), actor, voice artist
 Robert Bloch (1917–1994), writer
 Lloyd Bochner (1924–2005), actor
 Peter Bogdanovich (1939–2022), director and screenwriter
 Benedict Bogeaus (1904–1968), producer
 John Boles (1895–1969), actor
 Dorris Bowdon (1914–2005), actress
 Ray Bradbury (1920–2012), author; buried with his wife Marguerite McClure Bradbury
 Fanny Brice (1891–1951), actress, comedian, singer (formerly buried in Home of Peace Cemetery)
 William Brice (1921–2008), artist, son of Fanny Brice
 Les Brown (1912–2001), musician
 Vanessa Brown (1928–1999), actress
 Clarence Bull (1896–1979), photographer
 Anne Buydens (1919–2021), philanthropist, film producer, wife of Kirk Douglas

C
 Sebastian Cabot (1918–1977), actor
 Sammy Cahn (1913–1993), songwriter
 Truman Capote (1924–1984), author
 Edward Carrere (1906–1984), director
 Harry Carey, Jr. (1921–2012), actor
 Mary Carlisle (1914–2018), actress
 John Cassavetes (1929–1989), actor, screenwriter, director, producer
 Mario Castelnuovo-Tedesco (1895–1968), composer
 James Coburn (1928–2002), actor
 Jackie Collins (1937–2015), novelist, screenwriter, producer
 Michel Colombier (1939–2004), musician, composer
 Ray Conniff (1916–2002), musician
 Richard Conte (1910–1975), actor
 Tim Conway (1933–2019), actor, comedian
 Lawrence Cook (1930–2003), actor
 Ian Copeland (1949–2006), music promoter
 Alexander Courage (1919–2008), composer
 Bob Crane (1928–1978), actor
 Norma Crane (1928–1973), actress

D

 Rodney Dangerfield (1921–2004), comedian, actor
 Helmut Dantine (1917–1982), actor
 Danny Dark (1938–2004), announcer
 Steve Darrell (1904–1970), actor
 Marvin Davis (1925–2004), oil tycoon, businessman
 Jason Davis (1984–2020), actor
 Richard Dawson (1932–2012), actor, television host
 Don DeFore (1913–1993), actor
 Laura Devon (1931–2007), actress
 Philip Dorn (1901–1975), actor
 Eric Douglas (1958–2004), actor
 Kirk Douglas (1916–2020), actor
 Dominique Dunne (1959–1982), Poltergeist actress, daughter of writer Dominick Dunne, sister of actor-director Griffin Dunne, murder victim
 Ariel Durant (1898–1981), historian, Pulitzer Prize in literature, co-wrote The Story of Civilization, wife of Will Durant
 Will Durant (1885–1981), historian, Pulitzer Prize in literature, co-wrote The Story of Civilization, husband of Ariel Durant

E
 Nora Eddington (1924–2001), actress, 2nd wife of Errol Flynn, 3rd wife of Dick Haymes
 Roger Edens (1905–1970), vocal arranger, songwriter, producer
 Jack Elliott (1927–2001), songwriter
 Geoff Emerick (1945–2018), sound engineer
 Harry Essex (1910–1997), writer
 Dennis Etchison (1943–2019), writer
 Ray Evans (1915–2007), songwriter

F
 Peter Falk (1927–2011), actor
 Farrah Fawcett (1947–2009), actress
 Freddie Fields (1923–2007), talent agent
 Jay C. Flippen (1899–1971), actor
 June Foray (1917–2017), voice actress
 Michael Fox (1921–1996), actor
 Coleman Francis (1919–1973), film director
 Leslie Frankenheimer (1948–2013), set decorator
 Stan Freberg (1926–2015), voice actor
 Georgia Frontiere (1927–2008), football owner
 Faiza Rauf (1923–1994) Egyptian Princess

G
 Eva Gabor (1919–1995), actress
 June Gale (1911–1996), actress, wife of Oscar Levant
 Michael V. Gazzo (1923–1995), actor
 Christopher George (1931–1983), actor
 Leonard Gershe (1922–2002), composer
 Master Henry Gibson (1942–2002), musician
 Paul Gleason (1939–2006), character actor
 Thomas Gomez (1905–1971), actor
 Don Gordon (1926–2017), actor
 Robert Gottschalk (1918–1982), camera technician, co-founder of Panavision
 Walter Grauman (1922–2015), director
 Howard Greer (1896–1974), costume and fashion designer
 Jane Greer (1924–2001), actress
 Merv Griffin (1925–2007), producer, television host, singer

H

 Loretta King Hadler (1917–2007), actress
 Hayedeh (1942–1990), Persian language pop and classic singer from Tehran, older sister of Mahasti
 Carrie Hamilton (1963–2002), actress, singer, daughter of Carol Burnett
 Armand Hammer (1898–1990), oil tycoon, art collector, former president of Occidental Petroleum
 Bong Soo Han (1933–2007), martial artist
 Jonathan Harris (1914–2002), actor
 Harold Hecht (1907–1985), film producer
 Hugh Hefner (1926–2017), Playboy magazine founder and publisher, businessman
 Percy Helton (1894–1971), actor
 Florence Henderson (1934–2016), actress, singer, television host
 Francesca Hilton (1947–2015), actress, daughter of Zsa Zsa Gabor
 Connie Hines (1931–2009), actress
 Jonathan Hole (1904–1998), actor, buried with his wife Betty Hanna
 Ben Howard (1904–1970), aircraft designer, race pilot
 James Wong Howe (1899–1976), cinematographer
 Rosanna Huffman (1938–2016), actress
 Mark R. Hughes (1956–2000), founder of Herbalife
 Ronald Hughes (1935–1970), lawyer
 Ross Hunter (1920–1996), producer, director, actor
 Jim Hutton (1934–1979), actor

I
 Steve Ihnat (1934–1972), actor

J
 Donald G. Jackson (1943–2003), filmmaker
 Kevin Jarre (1954–2011), screenwriter
 Nunnally Johnson (1897–1977), screenwriter, director
 Louis Jourdan (1921–2015), actor
 Brenda Joyce (1917–2009), actress

K
 Phil Karlson (1908–1985), director
 Louis Kaufman (1905–1994), violinist
 Beatrice Kay (1907–1986), actress, singer
 Nora Kaye (1920–1987), ballerina
 Brian Keith (1921–1997), actor
 Cecil Kellaway (1893–1973), actor
 Nancy Kelly (1921–1995), actress
 Stan Kenton (1911–1979), musician
 Victor Kilian (1891–1979), actor, murdered
 James Howard "Dutch" Kindelberger (1895–1962), aviation executive
 Louis King (1898–1962), director
 Jack Klugman (1922–2012), actor
 Don Knotts (1924–2006), actor, comedian
 Miliza Korjus (1909–1980), opera singer
 Phyllis Kennedy (1914–1998), actress

L
 Perry Lafferty (1917–2005), director
 Bill Lancaster (1947–1997), actor, screenwriter
 Burt Lancaster (1913–1994), actor
 Sidney Lanfield (1898–1972), director
 Paul Laszlo (1900–1993), architect, furniture designer
 Ed Lauter (1938–2013), actor
 Marc Lawrence (1910–2005), actor
 Irving Paul Lazar (1907–1993), agent
 Joanna Lee (1931–2003), actress
 Peggy Lee (1920–2002), singer, songwriter, actress
 Ernest Lehman (1915–2005), screenwriter
 Janet Leigh (1927–2004), actress
 Jack Lemmon (1925–2001), actor
 Queenie Leonard (1905–2002), actress
Murray Lertzman (1928-1984), attorney
 Bruce Lester (1912–2008), actor
 Oscar Levant (1906–1972), actor, pianist
 Richard Levinson (1934–1987), writer
 Harry Lewis (1920–2013), actor, restaurateur
 Marilyn Lewis (1929–2017) fashion designer, producer
 Alan W. Livingston (1917–2009), writer, producer
 Jay Livingston (1915–2001), songwriter
 Sondra Locke (1944–2018), actress
 Louis Loeffler (1897–1972), editor
 Robert Loggia (1930–2015), actor, director

M

 Alexander Mackendrick (1912–1993), director
 Mahasti (1946–2007), Persian language pop singer from Tehran, younger sister of Hayedeh
 Karl Malden (1912–2009), actor
 Janet Margolin (1943–1993), actress, married to Ted Wass
 Dean Martin (1917–1995), actor, singer
 Andrew Marton (1904–1992), actor
 Samuel Marx (1902–1992), producer
 Pamela Mason (1916–1996), actress, wife of James Mason and Roy Kellino
 Portland Mason (1948–2004), actress, daughter of James Mason and Pamela Mason
 Shirley Mason (1900–1979), actress
 Osa Massen (1914–2006), actress
 Edith Massey (1918–1984), actress
 Carol Matthau (1925–2003), actress, wife of Walter Matthau and William Saroyan
 Walter Matthau (1920–2000), actor
 Ruth McDevitt (1895–1976), actress
 Rod McKuen (1933–2015), poet, composer
 Peter McWilliams (1949–2000), author
 Allan Melvin (1923–2008), actor, voice actor
 Lewis Milestone (1895–1980), director
 Marvin E. Miller (1913–1985), actor
 Shirley Mitchell (1919–2013), actress, wife of Jay Livingston
 Marilyn Monroe (1926–1962), actress
 Constance Moore (1920–2005), singer, actress
 Dolores Moran (1924–1982), actress
 Jeff Morris (1934–2004), actor

N
 Nader Naderpour (1929–2000), Iranian poet
 David Nelson (1936–2011), actor, son of Ozzie and Harriet Nelson, older brother of Ricky Nelson
 William Newell (1894–1967), actor
 Lloyd Nolan (1902–1985), actor

O

 Carroll O'Connor (1924–2001), actor
 Heather O'Rourke (1975–1988), actress
 Barbara Orbison (1950–2011), wife of Roy Orbison
 Roy Orbison (1936–1988), singer; grave unmarked

P
 Bettie Page (1923–2008), model
 Dorothy Patrick (1921–1987), actress
 Wolfgang Petersen (1941–2022), director
 Frank Pierson (1925–2012), screenwriter, director
 Waite Phillips (1883–1964), oil tycoon, philanthropist
 Gregor Piatigorsky (1903–1976), cellist
 Jacqueline Piatigorsky (1911–2012), chess player
 James Prideaux (1927–2015), playwright

R
 Ford Rainey (1908–2005), actor
 Donna Reed (1921–1986), actress
 Jimmie Reese (1901–1994), baseball player and coach
 Renie Riano (1899–1971), actress
 Buddy Rich (1917–1987), drummer, bandleader
 Minnie Riperton (1947–1979), singer
 Ben Roberts (1916–1984), screenwriter; co-creator of Charlie's Angels
 Doris Roberts (1925–2016), actress, philanthropist, author
 Wayne Rogers (1933–2015), actor
 Hillevi Rombin (1933–1996), Miss Universe 1955
 Ruth Rose (1896–1978), screenwriter
 Herbert Ross (1927–2001), film director

S
 Franklin Schaffner (1920–1989), film director
 G. David Schine (1927–1996), film producer
 Ernest B. Schoedsack (1893–1979), film director
 George C. Scott (1927–1999), actor; grave unmarked
 Vivienne Segal (1897–1992), singer, actress
 Anne Seymour (1909–1988), actress
 Sidney Sheldon (1917–2007), author
 Dorothy Shay (1921–1978), actress, singer
 Sam Simon (1955–2015), writer, producer, director
Lu Ann Simms (1932–2003), singer
 Sara Sothern (1895–1994), mother of Elizabeth Taylor
 Robert Stack (1919–2003), actor
 Sage Stallone (1976–2012), actor, son of Sylvester Stallone
 Ray Stark (1915–2004), film producer
 Josef von Sternberg (1894–1969), film director
 Donald E. Stewart (1930–1999), screenwriter
 Dorothy Stratten (1960–1980), actress, Playboy Playmate
 Danny Sugerman (1954–2005), writer, rock band manager
 Jennifer Syme (1972–2001), actress

T
 Don Taylor (1920–1998), actor, director
 Francis Lenn Taylor (1897–1968), art dealer, father of Elizabeth Taylor
 Kent Taylor (1907–1987), actor
 Irene Tedrow (1907–1995), actress
 William C. Thomas (1903–1984), film producer
 Marshall Thompson (1925–1992), actor
 Dan Tobin  (1910-1982), actor
 Ernst Toch (1887–1964), composer
 Alvin Toffler (1928–2016), author
 Mel Tormé (1925–1999), singer, actor
 Helen Traubel (1899–1972), opera soprano
 Les Tremayne (1913–2003), actor
 Frank Tuttle (1892–1963), screenwriter, producer

V
 Sigrid Valdis (1935–2007), actress, widow of Bob Crane
 Clyde Van Dusen (1886–1951), horse trainer, won 1929 Kentucky Derby
 Romeo Vasquez (1939–2017), actor
 John Vivyan (1915–1983), actor

W
 June Walker (1900–1966), actress
 Pat Walshe (1900–1991), actor
 Larry Ward (1925–1985), actor, screenwriter
 Harry Warren (1893–1981), songwriter
 Joe Weider (1919–2013), bodybuilder
 Winifred Westover (1899–1978), actress
 Chrissie White (1895–1989), silent film actress
 Michael White (1936–2016), producer
 Sean Whitesell (1963–2015), actor
 Margaret Whiting (1924–2011), singer
 Herbert Wiere (1908–1999), performer
 Cornel Wilde (1915–1989), actor
 Billy Wilder (1906–2002), filmmaker
 Carl Wilson (1946–1998), singer, member of The Beach Boys
 Estelle Winwood (1883–1984), actress
 Albert Wohlstetter (1913–1997), nuclear strategist
 Roberta Wohlstetter (1912–2007), historian of military intelligence
 Natalie Wood (1938–1981), actress

Y
 Edward Yang (1947–2007), filmmaker

Z

 Darryl F. Zanuck (1902–1979), head of 20th Century Fox studios, father of Richard D. Zanuck
 Virginia Zanuck (1908–1982), actress, wife of Darryl F. Zanuck, mother of Richard D. Zanuck
 Frank Zappa (1940–1993), composer, musician, satirist, leader of The Mothers of Invention; grave unmarked
 Gail Zappa (1945–2015), widow of Frank Zappa and trustee of the Zappa Family Trust; buried next to her husband Frank Zappa

See also
 List of United States cemeteries

References

External links

 map showing location of celebrity graves
 California Cemetery and Funeral Bureau Certificate of Authority – Cemetery, License Number 506, Funeral Establishment License Number 951
 

Cemeteries in Los Angeles
Cemeteries in Los Angeles County, California
Westwood, Los Angeles
1905 establishments in California